The following outline is provided as an overview of and topical guide to Slovakia:

Slovakia – landlocked sovereign country located in Central Europe. Slovakia borders the Czech Republic and Austria to the west, Poland to the north, Ukraine to the east and Hungary to the south. The capital Bratislava is its largest city. It is a member of the European Union.

General reference 

 Pronunciation:
 Common English country name:  Slovakia
 Official English country name:  The Slovak Republic
 Common endonym(s): Slovensko
 Official endonym(s): Slovenská republika
 Adjectival(s): Slovak
 Demonym(s): Slovaks
 Etymology: Name of Slovakia
 International rankings of Slovakia
 ISO country codes:  SK, SVK, 703
 ISO region codes:  See ISO 3166-2:SK
 Internet country code top-level domain:  .sk

Geography of Slovakia 

 Slovakia is: a landlocked country
 Location:
 Northern Hemisphere and Eastern Hemisphere
 Eurasia
 Europe
 Central Europe
 Eastern Europe
 Time zone:  Central European Time (UTC+01), Central European Summer Time (UTC+02)
 Extreme points of Slovakia
 High:  Gerlachovský štít 
 Low:  Bodrog 
 Land boundaries:  1,474 km
 676 km
 420 km
 197 km
 91 km
 90 km
 Coastline:  none
 Population of Slovakia: 5,404,784 (June 30, 2008)  - 109th most populous country

 Area of Slovakia: 49,036 km2
 Atlas of Slovakia

Environment of Slovakia 

 Climate of Slovakia
 Renewable energy in Slovakia
 Geology of Slovakia
 Protected areas of Slovakia
 Biosphere reserves in Slovakia
 National parks of Slovakia
 Wildlife of Slovakia
 Fauna of Slovakia
 Birds of Slovakia
 Mammals of Slovakia

Natural geographic features of Slovakia 

 Glaciers of Slovakia
 Islands of Slovakia
 Lakes of Slovakia
 Mountains of Slovakia
 Volcanoes in Slovakia
 Rivers of Slovakia
 Waterfalls of Slovakia
 Valleys of Slovakia
 World Heritage Sites in Slovakia

Regions of Slovakia

Ecoregions of Slovakia 

List of ecoregions in Slovakia
 Ecoregions in Slovakia

Administrative divisions of Slovakia 

Administrative divisions of Slovakia
 Regions of Slovakia
 Districts of Slovakia

Regions of Slovakia 

Regions of Slovakia

Districts of Slovakia 

Districts of Slovakia

Demography of Slovakia 

Demographics of Slovakia

Government and politics of Slovakia 

Politics of Slovakia
 Form of government: parliamentary representative democratic republic
 Capital of Slovakia: Bratislava
 Elections in Slovakia

 Political parties in Slovakia

 Political scandals of Slovakia

Branches of the government of Slovakia 

Government of Slovakia

Executive branch of the government of Slovakia 
 Head of state: President of Slovakia,
 Head of government: Prime Minister of Slovakia,
 Cabinet of Slovakia

Legislative branch of the government of Slovakia 
 Parliament of Slovakia (unicameral)

Judicial branch of the government of Slovakia 

Court system of Slovakia
 Supreme Court of Slovakia
 Constitutional Court of Slovakia

Foreign relations of Slovakia 

Foreign relations of Slovakia
 Diplomatic missions in Slovakia
 Diplomatic missions of Slovakia

International organization membership 
The Slovak Republic is a member of:

Australia Group
Bank for International Settlements (BIS)
Black Sea Economic Cooperation Zone (BSEC) (observer)
Central European Initiative (CEI)
Confederation of European Paper Industries (CEPI)
Council of Europe (CE)
Council of the Baltic Sea States (CBSS) (observer)
Euro-Atlantic Partnership Council (EAPC)
European Bank for Reconstruction and Development (EBRD)
European Investment Bank (EIB)
European Organization for Nuclear Research (CERN)
European Union (EU)
Food and Agriculture Organization (FAO)
International Atomic Energy Agency (IAEA)
International Bank for Reconstruction and Development (IBRD)
International Chamber of Commerce (ICC)
International Civil Aviation Organization (ICAO)
International Criminal Court (ICCt)
International Criminal Police Organization (Interpol)
International Development Association (IDA)
International Energy Agency (IEA)
International Federation of Red Cross and Red Crescent Societies (IFRCS)
International Finance Corporation (IFC)
International Labour Organization (ILO)
International Maritime Organization (IMO)
International Mobile Satellite Organization (IMSO)
International Monetary Fund (IMF)
International Olympic Committee (IOC)
International Organization for Migration (IOM)
International Organization for Standardization (ISO)
International Red Cross and Red Crescent Movement (ICRM)
International Telecommunication Union (ITU)
International Trade Union Confederation (ITUC)

Inter-Parliamentary Union (IPU)
Multilateral Investment Guarantee Agency (MIGA)
Nonaligned Movement (NAM) (guest)
North Atlantic Treaty Organization (NATO)
Nuclear Energy Agency (NEA)
Nuclear Suppliers Group (NSG)
Organisation internationale de la Francophonie (OIF) (observer)
Organisation for Economic Co-operation and Development (OECD)
Organization for Security and Cooperation in Europe (OSCE)
Organisation for the Prohibition of Chemical Weapons (OPCW)
Organization of American States (OAS) (observer)
Permanent Court of Arbitration (PCA)
Schengen Convention
Southeast European Cooperative Initiative (SECI) (observer)
United Nations (UN)
United Nations Conference on Trade and Development (UNCTAD)
United Nations Educational, Scientific, and Cultural Organization (UNESCO)
United Nations Industrial Development Organization (UNIDO)
United Nations Peacekeeping Force in Cyprus (UNFICYP)
United Nations Truce Supervision Organization (UNTSO)
Universal Postal Union (UPU)
Western European Union (WEU) (associate partner)
World Confederation of Labour (WCL)
World Customs Organization (WCO)
World Federation of Trade Unions (WFTU)
World Health Organization (WHO)
World Intellectual Property Organization (WIPO)
World Meteorological Organization (WMO)
World Tourism Organization (UNWTO)
World Trade Organization (WTO)
Zangger Committee (ZC)

Law and order in Slovakia 

Law of Slovakia
 Capital punishment in Slovakia
 Constitution of Slovakia
 Crime in Slovakia
 Human rights in Slovakia
 LGBT rights in Slovakia
 Freedom of religion in Slovakia
 Law enforcement in Slovakia
 Slovak mafia
 Prisons in Slovakia

Military of Slovakia 

Military of Slovakia
 Command
 Commander-in-chief:
 Ministry of Defence of Slovakia
 Forces
 Army of Slovakia
 Navy of Slovakia
 Air Force of Slovakia
 Special forces of Slovakia
 Military ranks of Slovakia

Local government in Slovakia 

Local government in Slovakia

History of Slovakia 

History of Slovakia
 Timeline of the history of Slovakia
 Current events of Slovakia
 Economic history of Slovakia
 Military history of Slovakia

Culture of Slovakia 

Culture of Slovakia
 Architecture of Slovakia
 Cuisine of Slovakia
 Festivals in Slovakia
 Languages of Slovakia
 Media in Slovakia
 Museums in Slovakia
 National symbols of Slovakia
 Coat of arms of Slovakia
 Flag of Slovakia
 National anthem of Slovakia
 People of Slovakia
 Prostitution in Slovakia
 Public holidays in Slovakia
 Records of Slovakia
 Religion in Slovakia
 Buddhism in Slovakia
 Christianity in Slovakia
 Hinduism in Slovakia
 Islam in Slovakia
 Judaism in Slovakia
 Sikhism in Slovakia
 World Heritage Sites in Slovakia

Art in Slovakia 
 Art in Slovakia
 Cinema of Slovakia
 Literature of Slovakia
 Music of Slovakia
 Television in Slovakia
 Theatre in Slovakia

Sports in Slovakia 

Sport in Slovakia
 Football in Slovakia
 Slovakia at the Olympics

Economy and infrastructure of Slovakia 

Economy of Slovakia
 Economic rank, by nominal GDP (2007): 56th (fifth-sixth)
 Agriculture in Slovakia
 Banking in Slovakia
 National Bank of Slovakia
 Communications in Slovakia
 Internet in Slovakia
 Companies of Slovakia
Currency of Slovakia: Euro (see also: Euro topics)
ISO 4217: EUR
 Economic history of Slovakia
 Energy in Slovakia
 Energy policy of Slovakia
 Oil industry in Slovakia
 Health care in Slovakia
 Mining in Slovakia
 Slovakia Stock Exchange
 Tourism in Slovakia
 Transport in Slovakia
 Airports in Slovakia
 Rail transport in Slovakia
 Roads in Slovakia
 Water supply and sanitation in Slovakia

Education in Slovakia 

Education in Slovakia

See also 

Slovakia
Index of Slovakia-related articles
List of international rankings
List of Slovakia-related topics
Member state of the European Union
Member state of the North Atlantic Treaty Organization
Member state of the United Nations
Outline of Europe
Outline of geography

References

External links 

 General
 The Slovak Republic Government Office
 Google satellite map of Slovakia

 Statistics
 CIA World Factbook - Slovakia
 Statistical Office of the Slovak Republic

 News
 The Slovak Spectator, English-speaking news magazine
 Slovakia today, English-language online newspaper

Slovakia
Outline